The 1950 Washington and Lee Generals football team was an American football team that represented Washington and Lee University in the Southern Conference during the 1950 college football season. In their second season under head coach George T. Barclay, the Generals compiled an 8–3 record, won the conference championship, and lost to Wyoming in the 1951 Gator Bowl. The team played its home games at Wilson Field in Lexington, Virginia.

Schedule

References

Washington and Lee
Washington and Lee Generals football seasons
Southern Conference football champion seasons
Washington and Lee Generals football